Minnesota State Highway 78 (MN 78) is a highway in west-central Minnesota, which runs from State Highway 79 near Erdahl and continues north to its northern terminus at its interchange with U.S. Highway 10 in Perham.

Route description

State Highway 78 serves as a north–south route in west-central Minnesota between Erdahl, Ashby, Battle Lake, Ottertail, and Perham.

Highway 78 parallels U.S. Highway 59 and State Highway 29.

Glendalough State Park is located 1.8 mile east of the junction of Highway 78 and County Road 16 near Battle Lake.  The park entrance is located on County Road 16.
Minnesota DNR website for Glendalough State Park - Link

History
State Highway 78 was authorized in 1933.

The south portion of Highway 78 was still gravel in 1953. All of the route was paved by 1960.

Highway 78 was extended south from the interchange with Interstate Highway 94/US Highway 52 to Erdahl over part of CSAH 10 on June 1, 2020. In exchange, Minnesota State Highway 54 was turned back to Grant County, and is now CSAH 54.

Major intersections

References

078
Transportation in Grant County, Minnesota
Transportation in Otter Tail County, Minnesota